"Poor Poor Pitiful Me" is a rock song written and first recorded by American musician Warren Zevon in 1976.

With gender references reversed, it was made a hit twice: first as a top-40 hit for Linda Ronstadt, then over a decade later by Terri Clark, whose version topped the Canadian country charts and reached the country top five in the U.S.

Warren Zevon version

Background
In keeping with Warren Zevon's sardonic lyrical style, the song's verses deal with a suicide attempt, domestic abuse, and a brush with sadomasochism. The song first appeared on Zevon's 1976 self-titled solo album. It is reputed to be a friendly swipe at Jackson Browne; Browne's own songwriting (such as "Here Come Those Tears Again" and "Sleep's Dark and Silent Gate" from The Pretender) could be quite depressing.

The song "Poor Poor Pitiful Me" was produced by Browne and was featured on Zevon's eponymous 1976 album Warren Zevon with backing vocals by Lindsey Buckingham.  The track was later included on his greatest hits compilations A Quiet Normal Life (1986), I’ll Sleep When I’m Dead (1996), and Genius: The Best of Warren Zevon (2002).  Live versions appeared on 1980s Stand in the Fire and 1993's Learning to Flinch.  Alternate studio versions were included in the 2008 reissue of Warren Zevon, as well as the posthumous 2007 compilation Preludes: Rare and Unreleased Recordings.

Linda Ronstadt version

Background
Linda Ronstadt recorded a gender-altered version of the song during 1977. Ronstadt would recall Jackson Browne had pitched "Poor Poor Pitiful Me" to her, teaching it to her in the living room of her Malibu home. "The verse in “Poor Pitiful Me” was “I met a girl on the Sunset Strip,” I think, “She asked me if I’d beat her / She took me up to her hotel room / And wrecked my mojo heater.” It was really funny, and I'm saying to Jackson, “I can’t sing those words, man! That’s not who I am. . . . I have to leave that part out.” 

With Zevon's blessing, Ronstadt replaced the verse with “Well I met a boy / In the Vieux Carré, down in Yokohama / He picked me up and he threw me down / Saying "Please don't hurt me Mama!".” This verse was also used in Clark's version of the song.

Ronstadt's interpretation was produced by Peter Asher for her multi-platinum album Simple Dreams. Ronstadt's live version appeared on the soundtrack album to the 1978 movie FM, while the studio version was included on her platinum-plus album Greatest Hits, Volume 2.

Reception
Released as a single (on the Asylum label at the beginning of 1978, Ronstadt's version was the week's highest debut on the Billboard Hot 100 chart the week of January 28, 1978.  It reached number 26 on the Cash Box Top 100 and number 31 in Billboard.

Chart performance

Terri Clark version

Background
Another hit cover version of the song was recorded by Canadian country singer Terri Clark. It was released in September 1996 as the lead single from her second album, 1996's Just the Same. Clark told Billboard magazine that she heard Linda Ronstadt's version of the song in a local gymnasium while she was exercising. She said "and I thought, what a cool song. What a great country record that could make. I started doing it live, and it worked."

Reception
"Poor Poor Pitiful Me" debuted at number 47 on the U.S. Billboard Hot Country Singles & Tracks for the week of October 12, 1996. Clark's version was a number one hit on the Canadian RPM country charts, and a number five hit on the country charts in the U.S.

Music video
The music video was directed by Deaton Flanigen and premiered in late 1996. It comprises black-and-white tour footage interspersed with Clark being approached by a series of men while her car is being fixed at a full service gas station. Eventually, she realizes the man fixing her car is the one for her. She starts to drive off, before calling him over to get in. The two drive off together, leaving the other two co-workers at the shop surprised.

Chart performance

Year-end charts

Other versions
In 1986, SNFU did a hardcore punk cover of the song on the compilation It Came from the Pit.  Lead singer Mr. Chi Pig sang the Linda Ronstadt lyrics with a few changes, but kept it as being about men he had encountered.
Vitamin String Quartet recorded an instrumental version of the song on Dad Get Me Out of This: The String Quartet Tribute to Warren Zevon in 2003.
In 2004 Jackson Browne and Bonnie Raitt covered it on Enjoy Every Sandwich: The Songs of Warren Zevon.

References

1978 singles
1996 singles
1976 songs
Songs about suicide
Warren Zevon songs
Linda Ronstadt songs
Terri Clark songs
Jackson Browne songs
Bonnie Raitt songs
Songs written by Warren Zevon
Song recordings produced by Keith Stegall
Asylum Records singles
Mercury Records singles
Music videos directed by Deaton-Flanigen Productions
Songs about trains
Songs about BDSM
Songs about domestic violence
Song recordings produced by Jackson Browne